Gianna Nannini (born 14 June 1954) is an Italian singer and songwriter. Her most notable songs include "America" (1979), "Fotoromanza" (1984), "I Maschi" (1987) and "Bello e impossibile" (1986), the latter a European hit with success in Austria, Germany, Italy and Switzerland.

Early life 
Nannini was born in Siena on 14 June 1954. She is the elder sister of former Formula One racing driver Alessandro Nannini. She studied piano and composition in Milan in the late 1970s and obtained a degree in Philosophy from the University of Siena in 1994. The following year she took part in a protest organized by Greenpeace at the French embassy in Rome against the decision of the French government to pursue nuclear experiments at Mururoa.

Career 

Nannini scored her first domestic hit in 1979 with the single "America" and the album California, which became a success in several European countries. Her international breakthrough happened in 1984 with the release of her sixth album, the Conny Plank-produced Puzzle, which peaked in the top 10 in the Italian, German, Austrian and Swiss charts. The first single from the album, "Fotoromanza", was supported by a music video directed by Michelangelo Antonioni, and went on to win many musical awards. Nannini embarked on a long European tour to support the album, culminating in a headlining gig at the Montreux Jazz Festival.

In 1986, her song "Bello e impossibile" was a European hit in Italy, Germany, Austria and Switzerland. Her 1987 compilation album Maschi e Altri sold over a million copies.

In 2004, she released the greatest hits album Perle, where a number of her most renowned songs were rearrangemed with the support of musicians such as Christian Lohr on piano (who also had a co-producer credit), and a string quartet composed of Vincenzo di Donna (first violin), Luigi de Maio (second violin), Gerardo Morrone (viola) and Antonio di Franca (violoncello). With this orchestra Nannini went on a European tour from 2004 to 2005.

The album Grazie was released in February 2006, and peaked at number one of the Italian hit-parade with the single "Sei nell'anima".

In April 2007, Nannini released Pia come la canto io, a collection of songs produced by Wil Malone and originally intended for a rock opera based on the medieval Tuscan character Pia de' Tolomei (briefly mentioned in Dante's Purgatorio) that would eventually be performed in 2008 after eleven years of gestation.

An acoustic version of her song Meravigliosa Creatura (from Perle) has been used in a 2008 advertisement commercial for the Fiat Bravo directed by Matthias Zentner. Fiat would later include another Gianna Nannini song, "Aria", in a subsequent Fiat Bravo ad.

Duets 
In 1987 she performed with Sting and Jack Bruce the "Three Penny Opera" by Bertolt Brecht and Kurt Weill at the Schauspielhaus in Hamburg. In 1990, she and Edoardo Bennato sang "Un'estate italiana", the official song of the Football World Cup 1990 composed by Giorgio Moroder. In September 2006, she recorded the single "Ama Credi E Vai" with Andrea Bocelli. Nannini was also featured on Einstürzende Neubauten member Alexander Hacke's solo album Sanctuary, on the track "Per Sempre Butterfly". In 2008 she duetted with the Italian rapper Fabri Fibra in his videoclip version of the song "In Italia". She also sang the song "Aria" with the Macedonian vocalist Toše Proeski.

Band current lineup 
 Gianna Nannini – vocals, guitar, violin, piano
 Milton Mcdonald – guitar, backing vocals
 Davide Ferrario – keyboards, backing vocals
 Davide Tagliapietra – guitar, backing vocals
 Mylious Johnson – drums
 Alex Kilier – bass
 Will Malone – producer, musical director

Personal life 
In August 2010, at the age of 56, Nannini announced that she was pregnant (the name of the father was not revealed). Nannini's pregnancy was prominently featured on the cover of Vanity Fair, where she was portrayed wearing a T-shirt with the inscription "God is a Woman". On 26 November 2010 Nannini's daughter Penelope Jane Charlotte was born in Milan. In 2017, Nannini decided to move to London with her partner, Carla. In her 2017 autobiography, entitled Cazzi miei, she revealed she was ready for a civil union with Carla, explaining she felt Italian laws could not give her any guarantee about Penelope's future in the case of Nannini's death.

Works

Discography 
 Gianna Nannini (1976)
 Una radura (1977)
 California (1979)
 G. N. (1981)
 Sconcerto Rock (1981, soundtrack)
 Latin Lover (1982)
 Puzzle (1984)
 Tutto Live (1985, live)
 Profumo (1986)
 Maschi e Altri (1987, compilation)
 Malafemmina (1988)
 Scandalo (1990)
 Giannissima (1991, live)
 Maschi e altri / Chicos y otros (1992)
 X Forza e x amore (1993)
 Dispetto (1995) No. 1 Italy
 Bomboloni (1996, compilation; including a song about bombolone)
 Cuore (1998) No. 2 Italy (Platinum)
 Momo (2002, soundtrack)
 Aria (2002) No. 7 Italy, No. 29 Switzerland
 Perle (2004) No. 6 Italy, No. 22 Switzerland
 Grazie (2006) No. 1 Italy (7× Platinum), No. 12 Switzerland, No. 32 Germany
 Pia come la canto io (2007) No. 5 Italy
 Giannabest (2007, compilation) No. 1 Italy (7× Platinum), No. 15 Portugal, No. 23 Switzerland, No. 32 Germany
 Giannadream – Solo I Sogni Sono Veri (2009) No. 2 Italy (4× Platinum)
 Extradream – Solo I Sogni Sono Veri (2010)
 Io e te (2011) No. 1 Italy (4× Platinum)
 Inno (2013) No. 1 Italy (Platinum)
 Hitalia (2014) No. 1 Italy (3× Platinum)
 Hitstory (2015) No. 5 Italy (Gold), No. 51 Switzerland
 Amore gigante (2017) No. 2 Italy (Gold), No. 14 Switzerland
 La differenza (2019) No. 4 Italy

Selected bibliography

References

External links 

 
 Review of Giannadream (in English)

1954 births
Living people
People from Siena
Italian women singer-songwriters
Italian pop singers
Italian rock singers
20th-century Italian women singers
University of Siena alumni
Italian LGBT singers
Italian LGBT songwriters
Bisexual women
Bisexual singers
Bisexual songwriters
21st-century Italian women singers